Bengal Jute Mill Workers' Union is a trade union of jute mill workers in West Bengal, India. The union is affiliated to the All India United Trade Union Centre.

References

Trade unions in India
Trade unions of the West Bengal jute mills
Jute industry trade unions
Organizations with year of establishment missing